Eddie Cudworth (11 January 1911 – 19 February 1990) was a Canadian long-distance runner. He competed in the marathon at the 1932 Summer Olympics.

References

1911 births
1990 deaths
Athletes (track and field) at the 1932 Summer Olympics
Canadian male long-distance runners
Canadian male marathon runners
Olympic track and field athletes of Canada
Athletes from Toronto